The 1939 Campeonato Carioca was the 34th edition of the tournament. The competition began on April 2, 1939 and ended on December 3. Flamengo won their 7th title in the history of the competition. Botafogo finished runners-up.

Format
The tournament was contested as a triple round-robin with nine teams competing.

Final standings

References

Campeonato Carioca seasons
Carioca